Green Hill Cemetery may refer to:

Green Hill Cemetery (Amsterdam, New York)
Green Hill Cemetery (Waynesville, North Carolina)
Green Hill Cemetery (Greensboro, North Carolina)
Green Hill Cemetery (Martinsburg, West Virginia)
Green Hill Commonwealth War Graves Commission Cemetery, in Turkey

See also
Green Hill Cemetery Gatekeeper's House, in Greensboro, North Carolina